The lateral compartment of the leg is a fascial compartment of the lower leg. It contains muscles which make eversion and plantarflexion of the foot.

Muscles 
The lateral compartment of the leg contains:
 Fibularis longus
 Fibularis brevis

Action 
 Foot evertors
 Foot plantarflexion

Nerve Supply 
The lateral compartment of the leg is supplied by the superficial fibular nerve (superficial peroneal nerve).

Blood Supply 
Its proximal and distal arterial supply consists of perforating branches of the anterior tibial artery and fibular artery.

Additional images

See also
Fascial compartments of leg

References

External links

 Diagram at patientcareonline.com

Muscles of the lower limb